Catherine Curtin is an American actress. She is best known for her role as correctional officer Wanda Bell in the Netflix comedy-drama series Orange Is the New Black (2013–2019). Her other notable recurring roles include Insecure, Stranger Things, and Homeland.

Life and career
Curtin was born and raised in New York City. She made her Broadway debut in the original production of Six Degrees of Separation. The following years, she appeared in many Off-Broadway productions, including the title role of Janis Joplin in Love, Janis, for which she was nominated for a Joseph Jefferson Award.

On television, Curtin appeared in episodes of New York Undercover, Sex and the City, Law & Order and 30 Rock. In 2013, she was cast in a recurring role as correctional officer Wanda Bell in the Netflix comedy-drama series Orange Is the New Black. Along with cast, she won two Screen Actors Guild Award for Outstanding Performance by an Ensemble in a Comedy Series in 2015 and 2016. She left the series in 2017 and returned for multiple episodes for final season in 2019. From 2016 to 2018, she had a recurring role in the HBO comedy series Insecure and in 2018 played Sandy Langmore in the seventh season of Showtime drama Homeland. In 2017, she began a recurring role as Dustin's mother Claudia Henderson in the Netflix horror series Stranger Things.

Curtin has played supporting roles in a number of films, including Extremely Loud & Incredibly Close (2011), The Wolf of Wall Street (2013), Catfight (2016), The Light of the Moon (2017), Beauty Mark (2017), Bad Education (2019), The Half of It (2020), Werewolves Within (2021), Worth (2021) and Red Pill (2021).

Filmography

Film

Television

References

External links

Living people
Actresses from New York City
American television actresses
American film actresses
American stage actresses
20th-century American actresses
21st-century American actresses
Year of birth missing (living people)